The 2013–14 season will be Kaposvári Rákóczi FC's 15th competitive season, 10th consecutive season in the OTP Bank Liga and 90th year in existence as a football club.

First team squad

Transfers

Summer

In:

Out:

Winter

In:

Out:

List of Hungarian football transfers summer 2013
List of Hungarian football transfers winter 2013–14

Statistics

Appearances and goals
Last updated on 1 June 2014.

|-
|colspan="14"|Youth players:

|-
|colspan="14"|Players no longer at the club:

|}

Top scorers
Includes all competitive matches. The list is sorted by shirt number when total goals are equal.

Last updated on 1 June 2014

Disciplinary record
Includes all competitive matches. Players with 1 card or more included only.

Last updated on 1 June 2014

Overall
{|class="wikitable"
|-
|Games played || 41 (30 OTP Bank Liga, 3 Hungarian Cup and 8 Hungarian League Cup)
|-
|Games won || 10 (4 OTP Bank Liga, 1 Hungarian Cup and 5 Hungarian League Cup)
|-
|Games drawn || 8 (7 OTP Bank Liga, 0 Hungarian Cup and 1 Hungarian League Cup)
|-
|Games lost || 23 (19 OTP Bank Liga, 2 Hungarian Cup and 2 Hungarian League Cup)
|-
|Goals scored || 49
|-
|Goals conceded || 66
|-
|Goal difference || -17
|-
|Yellow cards || 117
|-
|Red cards || 6
|-
|rowspan="1"|Worst discipline ||  Dražen Okuka (12 , 0 )
|-
|rowspan="2"|Best result || 6–0 (A) v Ajka - Magyar Kupa - 29-10-2013
|-
| 7–1 (A) v Siófok - Ligakupa - 20-11-2013
|-
|rowspan="1"|Worst result || 1–7 (A) v Debrecen - OTP Bank Liga - 28-07-2013
|-
|rowspan="1"|Most appearances ||  Benjamin Balázs (33 appearances)
|-
|rowspan="1"|Top scorer ||  Róbert Waltner (7 goals)
|-
|Points || 38/123 (30.89%)
|-

Nemzeti Bajnokság I

Matches

Classification

Results summary

Results by round

Hungarian Cup

League Cup

Group stage

Classification

Knockout phase

Pre-season

References

External links
 Eufo
 Official Website
 UEFA
 fixtures and results

Kaposvári Rákóczi FC seasons
Hungarian football clubs 2013–14 season